Jdate is an online dating service aimed at Jewish singles. The service is one of a number of demographically focused online match-making websites operated by Spark Networks, Inc.

Because of the focus on relationships between Jewish singles, Jdate is considered a special-interest online dating site. Former CEO Adam Berger calls this type of service "niche" dating.

The website is available in Hebrew and western European languages like English, German, Spanish, and French.

History
Jdate was founded in 1997 by Alon Carmel and Joe Shapira. After the launch, membership grew rapidly by word of mouth in tight-knit Jewish communities.

The site won a 2006 Webby award for social networking.

On November 10, 2014, Jdate launched a dating app designed for Jewish singles.

Members
Jdate has members worldwide, with users concentrated in the USA and Israel. Individuals do not have to be Jewish in order to join Jdate. While Jdate is oriented towards the Jewish population, it has also attracted those seeking Jewish mates. The reasons cited often have to do with perceived cultural traits, whether stereotypical or true: "nice" or wealthy Jewish men who treat women well; take-charge, and independent Jewish women who hold on to tradition. While many Jdate members respond in kind, others view the phenomenon as an intrusion that defeats the purpose of the site.

Members can mark their Jewish affiliation on their profile. Options include Conservadox, Conservative, Hasidic, Orthodox (Modern, Baal Teshuva and Frum), Reconstructionist, Reform, and "Culturally Jewish". Members can also select options like "Willing to Convert".

Jdate members have the option to seek heterosexual or homosexual relationships on the site. Profiles include options like "men seeking men" and "women seeking women" to help users connect with their desired matches.

Past and present celebrity Jdate members include:
 Steve Rothman, American politician, U.S. House of Representatives, from New Jersey
 Brad Sherman, American politician, U.S. House of Representatives from California
 Jesse McCartney, American musician

Operations
Previously based in Beverly Hills, Spark Networks is now based in Berlin, Germany, with additional offices in Lehi, Utah.

In 2013, the company authorized the repurchase of $5 million of its outstanding common stock as a reflection of confidence in the long-term business.

On November 2, 2017, Spark Networks SE (NYSE American: LOV) announced the successful completion of the previously announced merger of Spark Networks, Inc. and Affinitas GmbH in a stock-for-stock transaction.

References

External links
 

Online dating for specific interests
Jewish websites
Online dating services of the United States